William Dalderby (fl. 1383–1404) was an English politician. He was a Member (MP) of the Parliament of England for Lincoln from October 1383 and January 1404. William, the second son of Robert Dalderby, prospered in the wool trade. In September 1378, William became bailiff of Lincoln, and soon thereafter he received his first royal commission. During his year in office in 1383 as MP, his term was uneventful.

Offices held
Bailiff, Lincoln - September, 1378–1379
Mayor of Lincoln - 1382–1383, 1384–1385
Controller of a tax, Lincoln - December 1380
Collector, Lincoln - November 1386
Commissioner, Lincoln - November 1383
Mayor of the Boston Staple, Lincolnshire - July 1389 – 1390
Coroner of the liberty of Lincoln - August 1403 – 1406

References

14th-century births
15th-century deaths
English MPs October 1383
English MPs January 1404
Members of the Parliament of England (pre-1707) for Lincoln
Mayors of Lincoln, England